Stowe Mountain Resort is a ski resort in the northeastern United States, near the town of Stowe in northern Vermont, comprising two separate mountains: Mount Mansfield and Spruce Peak.

History
Alpine skiing came to Vermont when the Civilian Conservation Corps (CCC) cut the first trails on Mount Mansfield in 1933.  The National Ski Patrol was based on the Mount Mansfield Ski Patrol, the oldest in the nation founded in 1934.

Stowe Mountain Resort was long owned in its entirety by the Mount Mansfield Company. It in turn was owned since 1949 by insurance mogul C.V. Starr, founder of the
American International Group.  AIG became the primary owner in 1988, until selling ski-related operations and facilities at the resort to Vail Resorts on February 21, 2017. AIG and the Mount Mansfield Company will retain the Stowe Mountain Lodge, Stowe Mountain Club, Stowe Country Club and other real estate owned and held for potential future development.

With $37 million in revenue during Winter 2007-08, Stowe placed second to Killington Ski Resort's $37.3 million in Vermont.

Ski Area

The ski area is composed of Mount Mansfield and Spruce Peak. Some 116 trails on Spruce Peak and Mount Mansfield provide  of skiable terrain.

Ahead of the 2011–2012 season, Stowe replaced the FourRunner high-speed quad with a new high-speed quad, constructed by Doppelmayr USA.

References

External links
 
  Mt. Mansfield Ski & Snowboard Club
  Stowe Mountain Resort - NewEnglandSkiHistory.com - history and images

Vail Resorts
Ski areas and resorts in Vermont
American International Group
Stowe, Vermont
Buildings and structures in Stowe, Vermont
Tourist attractions in Lamoille County, Vermont